Le Miracle des loups, aka Blood on his Sword, is a French / Italian swashbuckler film from 1961, directed by André Hunebelle, written by Henry Dupuis-Mazuel, starring Jean Marais. The scenario was based on a novel by Maria Luisa Linarès. The film was known under the title "Im Zeichen der Lilie" (West Germany), "Blood on His Sword" or "The Miracle of the Wolves" (USA).

Numerous scenes were filmed at the Cité de Carcassonne.

Cast 
 Jean Marais : Robert de Neuville
 Rosanna Schiaffino (VF : Claire Guibert) : Jeanne de Beauvais
 Jean-Louis Barrault : Louis XI
 Roger Hanin : Charles le Téméraire
 Guy Delorme: Le comte Jean de Sénac
 Annie Anderson: Catherine du Tillais ou Marguerite
 Louis Arbessier: Le comte d'Hesselin
 Jean Marchat: L'archevêque
 Raoul Billerey : Jérôme
 Pierre Palfray : Mathieu
 Georges Lycan : Sire de Gavray
 Bernard Musson : Un évêque
 Paul Préboist : A baladin

See also 
 Le Miracle des loups (1924 film)

References

External links 
 
 Le Miracle des loups (1961) at the Films de France

1961 films
French historical adventure films
French swashbuckler films
1960s French-language films
Films directed by André Hunebelle
1960s historical adventure films
Films set in the 15th century
Cultural depictions of Charles the Bold
Cultural depictions of Louis XI of France
1960s French films